Santa Cruz del Comercio is a municipality located in the province of Granada, Spain. According to the 2005 census (INE), the city has a population of 544 inhabitants.

During the Andalusian earthquake of 25 December 1884, more than 70% of the houses collapsed and 20% were severely damaged. There were 13 dead and 19 injured.

References

Municipalities in the Province of Granada